Luigi Mario Binelli Mantelli (born 4 December, 1950) is an Italian admiral. He was Chief of Staff of the Italian Navy from 2 March 2012 to 28 January 2013 and Chief of the Defence Staff of Italy from 31 January 2013 to 28 February 2015.

In 1995 he took part to the United Nations Operations in Somalia II (UNOSOM II).

Binelli Mantelli attended the Francesco Morosini Naval School in Venice, Italy and the Italian Naval Academy in Livorno where he graduated with the rank of navy guard in 1973.

Honors and awards

References

Italian admirals
Living people
1950 births
Chiefs of Defence Staff (Italy)
Knights Grand Cross of the Order of Merit of the Italian Republic